Aandan Adimai is a 2001 Indian Tamil language drama film, directed by Manivannan, starring Sathyaraj, Suvalakshmi and Divya Unni.

Cast

Sathyaraj as Sivaraman
Suvalakshmi as Maheswari
Divya Unni as Gayathri
Ranjith as Ranjith 
Manivannan
Thalaivasal Vijay
Vagai Chandrasekhar
Nizhalgal Ravi
Raj Kapoor
Junior Balaiah
Periya Karuppu Thevar
Mayilsamy
Kalairani
Shanti Williams
Kamala Kamesh
Krithika as Sivaraman's sister (Debut)

Production
In the late 1990s, Manivannan attempted to make a film starring Sathyaraj, Prabhu and Livingston together titled Makkal Nanban. The film failed to take off, and he moved on to make Aandan Adimai.

Soundtrack
Soundtrack was composed by Ilaiyaraaja and lyrics were written by Vaali, Pulamaipithan, Muthulingam, Mu. Metha and Thamarai.

Reception
The Hindu wrote "Aandaan Adimai means well and if the incidents brought in had
been presented with force the film may have made an impact." Malini Mannath of Chennai Online wrote "Though one should commend the director for making a sincere attempt to tackle a controversial problem, one wishes the script was better crafted and the scenes had more depth".

References

External links

2001 films
2000s Tamil-language films
Films scored by Ilaiyaraaja
Films directed by Manivannan